Michael Walter Cronin (born July 17, 1971) is an American men's college basketball coach who is the head coach of the UCLA Bruins of the Pac-12 Conference. 

Cronin was named the Pac-12 Coach of the Year in his first season with the Bruins in 2019–20. The following year, his team was a Final Four team. Cronin arrived at UCLA having previously served as the head coach for the Cincinnati Bearcats for 13 seasons. Cronin had been named the coach of the year of the American Athletic Conference (AAC) in 2014 and guided Bearcats' program to nine straight NCAA tournament appearances (through 2018–19). Prior to joining Cincinnati in 2006, he coached the Murray State Racers from 2003 to 2006.

Early life
Cronin grew up on the west side of Cincinnati, the son of Peggy and Harold "Hep" Cronin. Hep Cronin was a high school coach with more than 400 career wins in Cincinnati. Mick was one of three children along with older brother, Dan, and sister, Kelly.  Not only did his father coach basketball, he also was a teacher, a baseball scout for the Atlanta Braves, and an employee at River Downs race track during the summers.

Attending La Salle High School, the  Cronin, playing point guard for his dad, earned all-city honors in basketball at LaSalle. He led the city in assists and was second in 3-point shooting percentage during the 1989–90 season. A knee injury to his anterior cruciate ligament (ACL) near the end of his junior season ended his playing career.

As a student at the University of Cincinnati, while accompanying his dad to scout a Cincinnati Woodward High School game, Cronin was offered a job coaching the freshman team and assisting with the varsity by then-Bulldogs coach Jim Leon. From 1991 to 1996, he served as a varsity assistant coach and junior varsity coach at Woodward High. Cronin compiled a 57–3 record in three seasons as JV coach, and as a varsity aide, Woodward claimed three city championships. While at Woodward, Cronin helped develop six players who went on to play Division I college basketball, including former University of Louisville players Eric Johnson and Dion Edwards, and former Cincinnati guard Damon Flint.

Cronin received a bachelor of arts degree in history from the University of Cincinnati in 1996.

In the spring of 1996, Cronin coached the East team in the Magic Johnson Roundball Classic. He was director of the 1994 Pittsburgh high school Roundball Classic national all-star game. Cronin has coached and served on the selection committee for the Adidas camp and spent four summers on the staff of the Five-Star Teaching Camp.

College coaching career

Early jobs
Cronin took his first college coaching job as a video coordinator under Bob Huggins at the University of Cincinnati in 1996–97, and the following season was elevated to assistant coach, a post he held at UC until 2001. Cronin built a reputation for his ability to evaluate and recruit top talent; at UC as an assistant for Huggins from 1997 to 2001, Cronin recruits included NBA draft selections Steve Logan (Golden State Warriors), DerMarr Johnson (Atlanta Hawks), Pete Mickeal and Kenny Satterfield (both drafted by the Dallas Mavericks), and Jason Maxiell (Detroit Pistons).

Cronin became the associate head coach and recruiting coordinator at Louisville under Rick Pitino, beginning with the 2001–02 season. In his first year, Cronin helped attract a top-10 ranked recruiting class.

Murray State
Cronin's first head coaching job was at Murray State, where he was hired in 2003. In three seasons at Murray, Cronin led the team to the NCAA tournament twice and was named the 2006 Ohio Valley Conference coach of the year.

Cincinnati
After the 2005–06 season, he was hired as Cincinnati's coach, replacing interim coach Andy Kennedy after the dismissal of Bob Huggins. Cronin had to pick up the pieces from a depleted program after Huggins was asked to resign with no warning three months before the 2005 season, and a temporary coach was used for a season. Due to the school having done little to no recruiting for nearly a year, Cronin was forced to scrounge for players. He even had a couple players on the football team play, one being future NFL linebacker Connor Barwin.

Although Cronin's teams struggled early in his UC career, he improved the school's win total each of his first five seasons. From the beginning of the 2010 season to February 3, 2017, the Bearcats had amassed a 166–63 record, spent 45 weeks ranked in the AP Poll, and reached six straight NCAA tournaments, while picking up four tournament wins.

For the 2009–10 season, Cronin was able to successfully recruit Lance Stephenson, the all-time leading scorer in New York state high school basketball history who later had NBA stints with multiple teams. During his one season at Cincinnati, Stephenson was named the Big East Rookie of the Year.

Cronin is also the only UC coach to ever lead the Bearcats to a win over a higher seed in the NCAA tournament, when 6th-seeded Cincinnati defeated 3rd-seeded Florida State in 2012. It was the only season that the Bearcats advanced to the Sweet Sixteen under Cronin. In 2018–19, Cincinnati appeared in its ninth straight NCAA tournament, but was eliminated in the first round by Iowa.

In 2011, the University of Cincinnati board of trustees approved a contract extension for Cronin through 2017 with an average pay of $1.5 million a year. It included an increase in salary for his staff, as well as an increase in the basketball program budget. In 2016, the UC board of trustees approved a 2-year extension that would have taken Cronin through the 2022–23 season.

Cronin had long been pushing for either a new arena or a renovation of Fifth Third Arena in order for the Bearcats to remain competitive on a national scale. In March 2017, the University of Cincinnati began an $87 million renovation which was completed in the fall of 2018. Cronin said, "This building is about our future and is a testament to the commitment our university and donors have toward our programs."

UCLA
On April 9, 2019, Cronin was named the fourteenth head coach of the UCLA Bruins, replacing the fired Steve Alford. At the time, the 47-year old Cronin had the most NCAA Division I wins (365) of any active coach younger than 50. He was also one of only six coaches to have led their school to the NCAA tournament in the each of the past nine seasons. Cronin had coached against the Bruins three times. After Cincinnati lost to UCLA in the 2017 NCAA tournament, they defeated the Bruins in two consecutive regular-season matches by an average of 21.5 points. Its 29-point win in 2018–19 was part of a UCLA four-game losing streak which led up to Alford's midseason dismissal. In his first year in 2019–20, the Bruins starting slowly at 8–9 before going 11–3 and finishing second in the Pac-12 at 12–6. Cronin was named the Pac-12 Coach of the Year. The Bruins earned a No. 2 seed and a first-round bye in the Pac-12 tournament. However, due to the COVID-19 pandemic, the conference tournament was cancelled before the Bruins' first scheduled game in the quarterfinals, and the NCAA tournament was called off as well.

In 2020–21, UCLA finished their regular season with a 17–8 record, 13–6 in the Pac-12. They lost their last three regular-season games in a row and lost their game against Oregon State in the Pac-12 tournament. They were selected to open in the First Four of the NCAA tournament. They defeated Michigan State in the First Four for the Bruins' first NCAA tournament win since 2017 and then went on to defeat BYU in a first-round game on their way to reaching the Sweet Sixteen. Cronin then led the Bruins to an overtime victory over No. 2 seeded Alabama, reaching the Elite Eight for the first time in his coaching career (and the first for UCLA since 2008). They defeated No. 1 seed Michigan to become the second First Four team to advance to the Final Four, the Bruins' first national semifinal since 2008. They faced Gonzaga, who was seeking to become the first undefeated national champion since Indiana in 1976. UCLA was a 14-point underdog, the largest Final Four point spread since the tournament expanded to 64 teams in 1985. The Bruins lost 93–90 in overtime after the Bulldogs' Jalen Suggs banked in a  shot as time expired in the game, a match that featured 19 lead changes and 15 ties.

On March 17, 2022, Cronin's contract was extended for 6 years to the 2027–28 season. He led the 2021–22 team to the Sweet Sixteen of the 2022 NCAA tournament, the first time the Bruins had reached the regional semifinals in consecutive seasons since 2015. In 2022–23, they won their first Pac-12 regular season championship since 2012–13. He was again voted the Pac-12 Coach of the Year. A two-seed in the 2023 NCAA tournament, UCLA advanced to their third straight Sweet Sixteen.

Personal life and community involvement
Before accepting the UCLA job, Cronin was very active in the Cincinnati area. Cronin annually spoke with the Young Executive Group of the Catholic Inner-City Schools Education (CISE) Fund. The group raises money from area corporations to help give children from low-income urban settings the opportunity to attend Catholic schools.

Cronin resided in Anderson Township in the Cincinnati area with his daughter Samantha.  He was married to Darlene Taylor until they divorced in 2009. Cronin's father, Hep, who lives with Mick's sister, Kelly, attends Bearcats games, frequently attends their practices and sometimes travels with the team. Cronin's mother, Peggy, died of cancer in 2005. His brother, Dan, starred at Bethel College in basketball and baseball, and was drafted by the Atlanta Braves in 1988. Dan is also a cancer survivor.

On December 22, 2014, during the 2014–2015 season, Cronin, 43, was diagnosed with an unruptured aneurysm detected when he underwent medical testing for unexplained headaches. On January 2, 2015, it was announced that, although doctors expected the condition to heal with rest and medication, Cronin would not coach the remainder of the season. However, Cronin said he felt great and that he would be able to continue to oversee the program and be involved in recruiting. On March 30, 2015 Cronin announced he had a clean bill of health and was cleared to return to full-time coaching duties following his diagnosis of an arterial dissection.

Head coaching record

 ^abc Cronin missed a portion of the 2014–15 season due to an illness, having only coached for the first nine games. Cronin was credited with both the wins and the losses for that season, based on a decision by athletic director Mike Bohn after school officials sought a ruling on the issue from the NCAA and were told that it was up to the school.

Notes

References

External links
 UCLA Bruins bio
 Cincinnati Bearcats bio

1971 births
Living people
American men's basketball coaches
Basketball coaches from Ohio
Cincinnati Bearcats men's basketball coaches
College men's basketball head coaches in the United States
High school basketball coaches in Ohio
Louisville Cardinals men's basketball coaches
Murray State Racers men's basketball coaches
Sportspeople from Cincinnati
UCLA Bruins men's basketball coaches
University of Cincinnati alumni